John Robertson Quinn (July 17, 1889 – April 29, 1979) was an American politician who served as the sixth national commander of the American Legion from 1923 to 1924. He also served on the Los Angeles County Board of Supervisors from 1930 until 1936.

Biography
John Robertson Quinn was born in Porterville, California, where he grew up and attended local schools. He was a member of The American Legion who served as the sixth national commander from 1923 to 1924. He was a primary candidate for mayor of Los Angeles in 1929. He was appointed by Governor C. C. Young on May 12, 1930, to replace Reuben F. McClellan on the Los Angeles County Board of Supervisors. He served until 1936, when he was replaced by Leland M. Ford. He died on April 29, 1979, at the age of 89.

References

External links 

 
 
 John R. Quinn at The Political Graveyard

1889 births
1979 deaths
20th-century American businesspeople
20th-century American politicians
20th-century Presbyterians
American Freemasons
American people of Irish descent
American Presbyterians
Burials at Inglewood Park Cemetery
Businesspeople from Los Angeles
California Golden Bears football players
California Republicans
Los Angeles County Board of Supervisors
Military personnel from California
National Commanders of the American Legion
People from Delano, California
People from Porterville, California
Ranchers from California
Shriners
United States Army officers
United States Army personnel of World War I